Andrew Jay McClurg (born October 15, 1954) is a professor of law holding the Herbert Herff Chair of Excellence in Law at the University of Memphis Cecil C. Humphreys School of Law, specializing in torts, products liability, privacy law, and firearms policy. Although he has published numerous academic works, he is also known as a legal humorist, having written two legal humor books, as well as a monthly legal humor column in the American Bar Association Journal that ran for more than four years.  He is also the creator of Lawhaha.com, a legal humor website.

Career
McClurg received his Bachelor of Science and Juris Doctor from the University of Florida, where he was a member of the Florida Law Review and graduated Order of the Coif. He then served as a law clerk to U.S. District Judge Charles R. Scott (M.D. Fla.). After working for several years as a litigator, McClurg began his academic career at the University of Arkansas at Little Rock, where he eventually became the Nadine H. Baum Distinguished Professor of Law.  He also taught as a visiting law professor at Wake Forest University, the University of Colorado, and Golden Gate University. In 2002, he became a member of the founding faculty at the Florida International University College of Law.  In 2006, he accepted the Herff Chair at the University of Memphis.

McClurg has received several awards for both teaching and research. His teaching awards include the University of Memphis's 2009-10 Distinguished Teaching Award and 2009 Excellence in Legal Education Award, as well as five other teaching awards (including four Teacher of the Year awards). He has received three law school excellence awards for research, most recently the 2017 Farris Bobango Award for Faculty Scholarship.

Publications
McClurg's published literature comprises seven books, including the popular law school prep book, 1L of a Ride: A Well-Traveled Professor's Roadmap to Success in the First Year of Law School. He has published twenty-seven law review articles, including those at Northwestern University, Boston University, the University of Notre Dame, University of North Carolina at Chapel Hill, American University, Cincinnati, Colorado, Oregon, UC Davis, UC Hastings, Temple, Connecticut, and Wake Forest; and roughly seventy-five other articles.

Books
The Law School Trip (the insider's guide to law school) (Trafford 2001). 
Gun Control and Gun Rights (New York University Press 2002) (with David Kopel and Brannon Denning). 
Amicus Curiae: An Anthology of Legal Humor (Carolina Academic Press 2003) (with Robert M. Jarvis and Thomas E. Baker). 
Practical Global Tort Litigation: United States, Germany, and Argentina (Carolina Academic Press 2007) (with Adem Koyuncu and Luis Sprovieri) 
The "Companion Text" to Law School: Understanding and Surviving Life with a Law Student (West Academic Publishing 2012). 
Guns and the Law: Cases, Problems, and Explanation (Carolina Academic Press 2016) (with Brannon Denning). 
1L of a Ride: A Well-Traveled Professor's Roadmap to Success in the First Year of Law School (West Academic Publishing 3d ed. 2017).

References

External links
Profile of Andrew McClurg from the Cecil C. Humphreys School of Law
McClurg's Legal Humor Headquarters

1954 births
People from East Lansing, Michigan
Living people
American legal scholars
American humorists
Fredric G. Levin College of Law alumni
Florida International University College of Law faculty
University of Memphis faculty
Wake Forest University faculty
University of Colorado faculty
Golden Gate University faculty
University of Arkansas at Little Rock faculty